The Bishop of Hong Kong is the head of the Roman Catholic Diocese of Hong Kong, who is responsible for looking after its spiritual and administrative needs. The position has since 2021 been held by Stephen Chow. The Diocese of Hong Kong is nominally part of the ecclesiastical province of Canton and thus is a suffragan of that archdiocese.  However, it has been exempt in practice since 1951, when the People's Republic of China severed diplomatic relations with the Holy See.  As a Crown colony of the United Kingdom at the time, Hong Kong was unaffected by this and relations with the Vatican continued unabated. Consequently, the bishop of Hong Kong answers "directly to the Holy See".

The diocese began as the Apostolic Prefecture of Hong Kong, which was created on 22 April 1841.  Theodore Joset was appointed its first ordinary, and under his reign, the city's first Catholic church was built on Wellington Street.  On 2 September 1890, the prefecture was elevated to the status of apostolic vicariate. It was raised to the level of diocese on 11 April 1946, as part of the establishment of the ecclesiastical hierarchy in China under the papal bull Quotidie Nos by Pope Pius XII.

Nine men have been Bishop of Hong Kong; another six were heads of its antecedent jurisdictions. Three bishops – John Baptist Wu, Joseph Zen, and John Tong Hon – were elevated to the College of Cardinals.  Francis Hsu, the ninth ordinary of the diocese, was the first ethnically Chinese bishop of Hong Kong.  Tong, whose episcopacy spanned from 2009 to 2017, was the first bishop born in Hong Kong.  Wu had the longest tenure as Bishop of Hong Kong, serving for 27 years from 1975 to 2002, while his immediate predecessor Peter Lei held the position for seven months (1973–1974), marking the shortest episcopacy.

List of ordinaries

Apostolic Prefects of Hong Kong

Apostolic Vicars of Hong Kong

Bishops of Hong Kong

See also 
 List of Anglican archbishops of Hong Kong

Notes

References

General

Specific

 
Catholic Church in Hong Kong
Roman Catholic bishops
Hong Kong
Roman Catholic bishops